The Sikkim football team is an Indian football team represents Sikkim in Indian state football competitions including the Santosh Trophy.

They have appeared in the Santosh Trophy finals 4 times.

History
The Sikkim football team represents Sikkim, a former protectorate  and now state of India. When a protectorate, they were not affiliated with FIFA or the Asian Football Confederation, and therefore did not compete for the FIFA World Cup or Asian Cup.

They compete in the Santosh Trophy as they did when independent, but they have never won the trophy.

Squad
The following 22 players were called for the 2022–23 Santosh Trophy.

Honours 
 B.C. Roy Trophy
 Runners-up (1): 1998–99

References

External links
List of matches in Roon Ba

Football in Sikkim
Santosh Trophy teams